Overath Breitner da Silva Medina, known simply as Breitner (born September 9, 1989 in Barcelona), is a Venezuelan retired footballer who played as an attacking midfielder.

Career
Breitner signed for União da Madeira, on 29 May 2015, on a two-year contract.

Career statistics
(Correct )

according to combined sources on the soccerway.com

Personal life 
He is the son of former Venezuelan footballer Joaquín da Silva, who played during his career under his alias Fariñas. He was namesaked after the German footballers Wolfgang Overath and Paul Breitner.

References

External links
Fútbol Talentos

1989 births
Living people
People from Barcelona, Venezuela
Venezuelan footballers
Association football midfielders
Santos FC players
Figueirense FC players
Criciúma Esporte Clube players
Clube Náutico Capibaribe players
Esporte Clube XV de Novembro (Piracicaba) players
Boa Esporte Clube players
A.C.C.D. Mineros de Guayana players
C.F. União players
Leixões S.C. players
F.C. Arouca players
Campeonato Brasileiro Série A players
Campeonato Brasileiro Série B players
Venezuelan Primera División players
Liga Portugal 2 players
Venezuelan expatriate footballers
Expatriate footballers in Brazil
Expatriate footballers in Portugal
Venezuelan expatriate sportspeople in Brazil
Venezuelan expatriate sportspeople in Portugal
Brazilian people of Venezuelan descent